Santa Fe Mysteries: Sacred Ground is a video game, the second in the Santa Fe Mysteries series after The Elk Moon Murder.

Plot
In Sacred Ground, the wife of a local businessman is kidnapped.

Reception

The game received reviews ranging from negative to positive. JustAdventure thought the game was a "slight improvement" over The Elk Moon Murders, while noting "[it] is not entirely easy to classify - somewhere between an interactive movie and an adventure game". In a 2001 retrospective, Programmer In Black wrote "For an older game, the game play here holds up well." Just Adventure said "There is one thing that [the game] absolutely, positively isn't: unique". Allgame gave Sacred Ground 2.5 stars out of 5. Tekno Magazine noted the annoyance of switching between the game's two CDs when moving back and forth between different locations. PC Player felt the title was a missed opportunity to build on the world created in the predecessor. MacGamer thought the title was serviceable in the genre of interactive murder mysteries though admitted it was not revolutionary in any way. The Adrenaline Vault praised the immersive characters and the atmospheric music.

Reviews
Just Adventure - May 20, 2002
PC Player (Germany) - Feb, 1997
Computer Games Magazine - 1997

References

External links
 (archived)

1997 video games
Activision games
Adventure games
Criminal law video games
DOS games
Full motion video based games
MacOS games
Single-player video games
Video game sequels
Video games about police officers
Video games developed in the United States
Windows games